Johan Vekemans (born 6 December 1964) is a former professional tennis player from the Netherlands.  

Vekemans enjoyed most of his tennis success while playing doubles.  During his career he finished runner-up in 2 doubles events.  He achieved a career-high doubles ranking of World No. 75 in 1986.

Career finals

Doubles (2 runners-up)

External links
 
 

1964 births
Living people
Dutch male tennis players
People from Goirle
Sportspeople from North Brabant